The Central District of Shahriar County is in Tehran province, Iran. At the National Census in 2006, its population was 516,022 in 134,378 households. The following census in 2011 counted 624,440 people in 178,794 households. At the latest census in 2016, the district had 744,206 inhabitants in 226,007 households.

References 

Shahriar County

Districts of Tehran Province

Populated places in Tehran Province

Populated places in Shahriar County